Elections to the French National Assembly were held in French Togoland on 2 January 1956 as part of the wider French elections. Nicolas Grunitzky of the Togolese Party of Progress was elected unopposed.

Results

References

Togo
1956 in French Togoland
Elections in Togo
January 1956 events in Africa